Cross Ash is a village in Monmouthshire, south east Wales.  It is located on the B4521 road between Abergavenny and Skenfrith, some six miles north east of Abergavenny.

Setting
Cross Ash is situated in a rural part of north-east Monmouthshire. The village is located on the southern foothills of Graig Syfyrddin, where several country lanes converge on the B4521 road. It is virtually equidistant between the "three castles of Gwent", White Castle, Skenfrith Castle and Grosmont Castle.

History and amenities
Cross Ash has a primary school which serves an expansive rural area. Next door to the school is a village hall which serves as the venue for the annual Cross Ash Show and Fun Day. There was formerly a post office and petrol station in the village however both are now closed.

In 2004 the name Croes Onnen was added to the road signs for the village. Although this is a literal translation of the village's English name into Welsh, campaigners suggested it was spurious and unnecessary, and claimed there had been no consultation with villagers. The campaigners successfully had the Welsh translation removed from the local road signs in 2011.

Notable people
Hallam Amos (professional rugby player) resides in the area.

Nicholas Maddern (voice talent) attended Cross Ash Primary School.

References

External links
 the Village Alive Trust - details of the locality including Cross Ash
 

Villages in Monmouthshire